Broken is a fantasy novel by written by Kelley Armstrong. It is the sixth in her Women of the Otherworld series and has the return of Elena Michaels as narrator.

Plot summary
In this story the half-demon Xavier calls in a favour - steal Jack the Ripper's From Hell letter away from a Toronto collector who had himself stolen it from the British police files. It seems simple, but in the process Elena accidentally triggers a spell placed on the letter which opens a portal into the nether regions of Victorian London. With thieving vampires, killer rats and unstoppable zombies on the loose, Elena and the Pack must find a way to close the portal before it is too late. To add to the confusion, Elena herself is pregnant with Clay's child (actually twins).

The story begins with Elena worrying about her current pregnancy. She has concerns about what effect her werewolf nature will have on the unborn child, something with no recorded precedent in Pack knowledge. Clay and Jeremy, also concerned, have imposed a number of restrictions on her actions too, which Elena accepts but is also frustrated by. She is, therefore, not entirely displeased to hear from Xavier Reese who offers her a deal: he will hand over information about a rogue mutt the Pack have been seeking in exchange for the Pack's help in stealing an artefact from a sorcerer - the From Hell letter.

The deal is agreed to and, after the mutt has been dealt with, Jeremy steals the letter. As they leave, however, Clay squashes a mosquito and smears Elena's blood on the document. This activates an inter-dimensional portal, which releases individuals previously entrapped there during the Victorian era. Now zombies, these track Elena, putting her and her unborn offspring at risk.

Attempting to rescue her, the Pack kill these zombies, but to their shock they keep returning. In addition, cholera has infected the Toronto water-supply and the city's rats have become diseased and aggressive. Modern individuals disappear through the portal by accident, whilst murders take place that lead them to suspect that they have released Jack the Ripper himself upon an unsuspecting public.

Characters
 Elena Michaels - Pack werewolf, Clayton's mate, pregnant with Clayton's child(ren).
 Clayton Danvers - Pack werewolf, foster son of Jeremy Danvers, top fighter in the pack, mate of Elena.
 Jeremy Danvers - Alpha werewolf of the Pack, foster father of Clayton Danvers.
 Antonio Sorrentino - Pack werewolf, best friend of Jeremy. 
 Nicholas (Nick) Sorrentino - Pack werewolf, best friend of Clayton.
 Jaime Vegas - Necromancer, works in Hollywood as a "fake" necromancer on TV, but is a real necromancer.  Has a crush on Jeremy Danvers.
 Katherine Danvers - Daughter of Elena and Clay (Born at the end of the story).
 Logan Danvers - Son of Elena and Clay (Born at the end of the story).
 Xavier Reese - Half-demon (father was an Evanidus demon) with teleportation abilities (limited to approximately 10 feet).  Gets Elena to agree to steal the "Ripper letter" by giving her information on a rogue mutt. Elena met him in Stolen (book number two in the series) when she was captured. Xavier saved her twice while she was imprisoned, once from being killed, and once from being raped by guards, and he comes back to get her to return the favor.
 Zoe - Vampire who helps Elena deal with her zombie problem.

Release details
Published May 2006 in paperback by Bantam Spectra in the United States.
Published the same month in paperback by Seal Books in Canada.
Published the same month in paperback by Time Warner Orbit in the United Kingdom.

External links
Book at publisher's website
Book review at thebestreviews.com s
Book review at sfsite.com
Book review at bookreporter.com s

References

2006 Canadian novels
Novels by Kelley Armstrong
Werewolf novels
Novels set in London
Novels set in Toronto
Bantam Spectra books